Le Perthus is a commune in the Pyrénées-Orientales department in southern France. Natives of Le Pertus are called Perthusiens and, in 2016, there were 586 inhabitants.

Le Perthus is also one of French territories on the Iberian Peninsula.

Geography

Le Perthus is situated in the canton of Vallespir-Albères and the arrondissement of Céret, in the historical region of Vallespir, on the borders with Catalonia, Spain. Its contiguous Spanish twin town, Els Límits (a parish of the commune of La Jonquera, in the Province of Girona), is situated in the east and south side of the urban area. Also part of the main road, Avenue de France, is in both France and Spain; and its eastern side (in Els Limits) is named Avinguda de Catalunya. Out of the main road, in which is situated the checkpoint (totally on the Spanish side), the other principal roads are Rue du Fort de Bellegarde (panoramic hill road to the fortress), Carrer del Dalt, Rue du Mas Rimbau, Calle del Correc (binational) and Rue de l'Église. It lies 6 km (4 mi) from La Jonquera, 14 km (9 mi) from Céret, 28 km (17 mi) from Figueres, 34 km (21 mi) from Perpignan, 64 km (40 mi) from Girona and 161 km (100 mi) from Barcelona.

Toponymy 
The name appears as Pertusium in 1306 and as Lo Pertus in 1343. Its origin is from the Latin pertusum meaning an opening in the mountain.

The name in Catalan is El Pertús.

History
In the early 14th century, Le Perthus was a property of the counts of Roussillon and Empúries.

Following the Treaty of the Pyrenees in 1659, the town represented the border with Spain.

Le Perthus first became a commune on 1 February 1837, by uniting the communes of Les Cluses and L'Albère. But because of too many protests from the people of those communes, they were separated on 29 November 1837. It was then decided many years later to make Le Perthus a commune in itself again. This time, small parts of territory only were taken from Les Cluses and L'Albère, and the village of Le Perthus once again became a commune on 29 April 1851. Municipal elections had already been organised in 1848 and quickly cancelled as it appeared that the mayor and the deputy-mayor had too many family ties with several of the municipal councillors, which is forbidden by French law.

In the 20th century Le Perthus was the site of a camp housing Republican escapees from Spain at the end of the Spanish Civil War.

Population

Economy
Le Perthus is a border town, partly in Spain and partly in France, situated on the Route Nationale RN9.  The frontier passes through part of the main street.  The Spanish part is almost entirely devoted to the sale of alcohol, tobacco and other goods which are considerably cheaper than in France, resulting in the town being crowded with bargain hunters from France.  In earlier times it was a convenient centre of contraband.

Places of interest
 Fort de Bellegarde is located on a hilltop above Le Perthus.

See also
Col du Perthus
Communes of the Pyrénées-Orientales department

References

External links

 Le Perthus  map on Google Maps
 Webpage about Fort de Bellegarde in Le Perthus

Communes of Pyrénées-Orientales
Divided cities
France–Spain border crossings